Li Ligong (February 1925 – 6 December 2020) was a Chinese revolutionist and politician.

Biography
He was born in Jiaocheng County, Shanxi, in February 1925. He was Chinese Communist Party Committee Secretary of his home province (1983–1991) and political commissar of the People's Liberation Army Shanxi Military District (1983–1985). He was a member of the 12th Central Committee of the Chinese Communist Party (1982–1987) and 13th Central Committee of the Chinese Communist Party (1987–1992). He was a delegate to the 7th National People's Congress (1988-1993) and 8th National People's Congress (1993–1998).

On December 6, 2020, he died of illness in Taiyuan, Shanxi, aged 95.

References

1925 births
2020 deaths
Members of the 12th Central Committee of the Chinese Communist Party
Members of the 13th Central Committee of the Chinese Communist Party
Members of the Standing Committee of the 9th National People's Congress
Delegates to the 8th National People's Congress
Delegates to the 7th National People's Congress
Members of the 4th Chinese People's Political Consultative Conference
People of the Cultural Revolution
People from Lüliang
Political commissars of the Shanxi Military District